Olimpiu Becheș (born 28 September 1955) is a former Romanian rugby player from Noul Sasesc, Sibiu, Romania. He played as a centre.

He played 6 matches for Romania, from 1979 to 1983, scoring a try, 4 points in aggregate.

External links
International Statistics

1955 births
Living people
Romanian rugby union players
Rugby union centres
Romania international rugby union players
Sportspeople from Sibiu
20th-century Romanian people